Franco Lautaro Cabral (born 13 August 1994) is an Argentine professional footballer who plays as a defender for Real Pilar.

Career
Cabral began his career with Platense. He made six professional appearances throughout the 2014 Primera B Metropolitana campaign, all of which were off the substitutes bench. Cabral's starting debut arrived on 20 March 2016 against Estudiantes, which was one of thirty matches he featured in across the 2016 and 2016–17 seasons. After no further appearances for Platense at first-team level, Cabral departed in July 2019 to Real Pilar of Primera C Metropolitana. He appeared nineteen times in 2019–20.

Career statistics
.

References

External links

1994 births
Living people
Sportspeople from Buenos Aires Province
Argentine footballers
Association football defenders
Primera B Metropolitana players
Primera C Metropolitana players
Club Atlético Platense footballers
Real Pilar Fútbol Club players